The Men's 100 Butterfly event at the 2003 Pan American Games took place on August 13, 2003 (Day 12 of the Games). Benjamin Michaelson (USA) won the 100 butterfly in 53.04, bettering the Games record of 53.33.

Medalists

Records

Results

Notes

References
usaswimming
 Records

Butterfly, 100m